For Swingers Only is an album by American jazz/blues vocalist Lorez Alexandria released by the Argo label in 1963.

Critical reception

AllMusic reviewer Thom Jurek stated "This is simply among Lorez Alexandria's most stylized, disciplined, soulful, and satisfying recording sessions, and is highly recommended".

Track listing
 "Baltimore Oriole" (Hoagy Carmichael, Paul Francis Webster) – 3:11
 "Little Girl Blue" (Richard Rodgers, Lorenz Hart) – 3:34
 "All or Nothing at All" (Arthur Altman, Jack Lawrence) – 4:55
 "Traveling Down a Lonely Road" (Nino Rota, Michele Galdieri, Don Raye) – 3:45	
 "Mother Earth" (Peter Chatman) – 3:03	
 "Love Look Away" (Richard Rodgers, Oscar Hammerstein II) – 3:49
 "The End of a Love Affair" (Edward C. Redding) – 2:49
 "That Old Devil Called Love" (Alan Roberts, Doris Fisher) – 3:54

Personnel
Lorez Alexandria – vocals
Ronald Wilson – tenor saxophone, flute
John Young – piano, arranger 
George Eskridge – guitar
Jimmy Garrison – bass
Phil Thomas – drums

References 

1963 albums
Lorez Alexandria albums
Albums produced by Esmond Edwards
Argo Records albums